MCG+01-02-015 is a spiral galaxy in the constellation Pisces. It is an example of a void galaxy, and noted to be one of the loneliest galaxies spotted, with no other galaxy around 100 million light-years in all directions.

Observational history 
MCG+01-02-015 was previously classified as an elliptical galaxy of class E2 although higher-resolution imaging has revealed it to be a barred spiral galaxy.

Formation 
It is theorised by many astrophysicists that void galaxies are the result of large galactic filaments being pulled on by the gravity of a neighboring super cluster out of the less densely populated areas, galaxies such as MCG+01-02-015 are left behind by events such as these.

References

Barred spiral galaxies
Pisces (constellation)
MCG objects